Airbridge is a Russian aircraft manufacturer based in Moscow. The company specializes in the design and manufacture of ultralight trikes.

The company is the largest trike producer in Moscow. The company is noted for its use of modified four stroke Suzuki automotive engines.

Aircraft

References

External links

Aircraft manufacturers of Russia
Ultralight trikes
Manufacturing companies based in Moscow